Piezochaerus melzeri is a species of beetle in the family Cerambycidae. It was described by Mermudes in 2008.

References

Acanthocinini
Beetles described in 2008